Malikarjun is a Gaupalika in Darchula District in the Sudurpashchim Province of far-western Nepal.  Malikarjun has a population of 15581.The land area is 100.82 km2. It was formed by merging Malikarjun, Dadakot, Uuku, Bhagwati, Hunainath and Shankarpur VDCs.

References

Rural municipalities in Darchula District
Rural municipalities of Nepal established in 2017